Enderby Town Football Club Ltd v The Football Association Ltd [1971] Ch 591 is an English contract law case, concerning the scope of contracts and association rules that can be contrary to public policy and illegal.

Facts
The Football Association Ltd controlled association football, while county associations were affiliated to it. Enderby Town FC were fined by the county association, and they appealed to the FA. They claimed they should be represented by a solicitor and counsel, but the FA rejected this under rule 38(b) of their association. Enderby FA claimed that the rule 38 was contrary to natural justice.

Judgment
The Court of Appeal held that rule 38(b) was not invalid. However, it was noted that rule 40(b) which purported to prevent legal proceedings without the consent of the council was contrary to public policy and invalid.

Lord Denning MR said the following.

See also

English contract law

Notes

References

English contract case law